Lake Dorothy is a lake in King County, Washington. First labeled on Oliver Phelps Anderson's "New Map of the County of King, State of Washington, 1894"; the name was bestowed by Anderson for his daughter Dorothy Louise Anderson (1893-1912), a member of Sigma Kappa sorority. It is one of the largest lakes in the area and is the source of the East Fork Miller River.

Waterfalls 
A number of waterfalls surround Lake Dorothy. Florence Falls is located over a promontory a short distance downstream from the outlet. As Florence Falls reaches Camp Robber Creek a second waterfall is produced by a series of slides and cascades,  Camp Robber Cascades.

Access 

The lake can be reached by the Dorothy Lake Trail which is about 2 miles to the lake.  The trail continues another 2 miles along the lake’s shore to its south end.  After that it continues on, climbing up from the lake and eventually climbing over a ridge before descending to Bear Lake and the Taylor River.

See also 
List of lakes of the Alpine Lakes Wilderness
Miller River Waterfalls
Bear Lake
Taylor River

References 

Dorothy
Dorothy
Mount Baker-Snoqualmie National Forest